Stephen, Steven, or Steve Mellor may refer to:
Stephen J. Mellor (also known as Steve Mellor), computer scientist
Steven Mellor (swimmer) (also known as Steve Mellor), British Olympic swimmer